The Bénazet-Rennen is a Listed flat horse race in Germany open to thoroughbreds aged three years or older. It is run at Baden-Baden over a distance of 1,200 metres (about 6 furlongs), and it is scheduled to take place each year in May or June.

History
The event is named after Edouard Bénazet (1801–1867), the founder of Baden-Baden's Iffezheim Racecourse. It was established in 1972, and was originally contested over 1,400 metres. It was cut to 1,200 metres in 1983.

During the early 1990s, the Bénazet-Rennen was classed at Listed level. It was promoted to Group 3 status in 1995.

The race was titled the Belmondo-Pokal in 2011. It returned to Listed level and became known as the Mercedes-Benz-Sprintpreis in 2012.

Records
Most successful horse (3 wins):
 Lucky Strike – 2004, 2005, 2007

Leading jockey (3 wins):
 Andrzej Tylicki – Park Romeo (1981), Bismarck (1985), Home Please (1987)
 Terence Hellier – Auenadler (1999), Call Me Big (2002), Smooth Operator (2011)
 Adrie de Vries – Lucky Strike (2004, 2005, 2007)

Leading trainer (4 wins):
 Andreas Trybuhl – Lucky Strike (2004, 2005, 2007), Soave (2006)

Winners since 1990

 The 2010 running took place at Hoppegarten.

Earlier winners
 1972: Aga
 1973: Garzer
 1974: Garzer
 1975: Widerhall
 1976: Tarik
 1977: Gourmet

 1978: Noilly Prat
 1979: Iron Ruler
 1980: Nephrit
 1981: Park Romeo
 1982: Ratsherr
 1983: Another Risk

 1984: Mark
 1985: Bismarck
 1986: Elnawaagi
 1987: Home Please
 1988: Green's Picture
 1989: Savahra Sound

See also
 List of German flat horse races

References
 Racing Post:
 galopp-sieger.de – Bénazet-Rennen.
 horseracingintfed.com – International Federation of Horseracing Authorities – Bénazet-Rennen (2011).
 pedigreequery.com – Bénazet-Rennen – Baden-Baden.

Open sprint category horse races
Horse races in Germany
Recurring sporting events established in 1972